During the 1988–89 season, Leeds United A.F.C. competed in the Football League Second Division. It was Leeds' seventh season in the second tier since relegation from the First Division in 1982.

Season summary 
Following two seasons in and just outside of the promotion play-off places, Leeds made a poor start to the season, taking six points from the first six games. A League Cup victory against Peterborough United was not enough to prevent manager and former team captain Billy Bremner from being sacked. Howard Wilkinson was appointed as the new manager on 10 October after a brief caretaker stint by Peter Gunby.

Leeds rose to mid-table by December and sat in 6th by mid-February, losing only two league matches in that time. The turnaround stalled in late February and early March as a winless streak saw the team fall back to 12th in the league table.  Wilkinson brought Gordon Strachan, Chris Fairclough, and Carl Shutt into the lineup, and Leeds climbed the table back to 6th by 1 April. Although these new players would be involved in the successes of subsequent years, this season's resurgence did not last, and Leeds took just 11 points from the last eight games to finish the campaign in 10th.

First team squad

Transfers and loans

Transfers in

Transfers out

Loaned in

Loaned out

Source: leeds-fans.org

Competitions

Football League Second Division

League table

Results 

Source: www.soccerbase.com, www.worldfootball.net, leeds-fans.org

FA Cup 

Source:

League Cup 

Source:

Full Members' Cup 

Source:

Notes

References 

Leeds United
Leeds United F.C. seasons
Foot